Y. T. Lee may refer to:

 Yuan T. Lee, Taiwanese chemist
 Lee Yoon Thim, Malaysian architect and politician